Jaime Gilinski Bacal (born 14 December 1957) is a Colombian banker and real estate developer. Gilinski resides in London. According to Forbes, he is the second richest person in Colombia, with a net worth of US$3.6 billion as of 2020.

Early life 
He is the son of Isaac Gilinski Sragowicz, a banker and himself the son of Lithuanian Jewish immigrants.

Gilinski earned his BS in Industrial Engineering from Georgia Tech in 1978, and an MBA from Harvard Business School in 1980.

Banking 
In the 1990s, Gilinski acquired the Colombian assets of BCCI (Bank of Credit and Commerce International) for a nominal sum after its global collapse. Renamed Banco Andino, it became one of the most efficient banks in the Colombian banking system within four years. The Gilinski Group sold the reconstituted bank for a reported $70 million.

The family then moved to purchase Banco de Colombia for $365 million, in what was then the largest privatization in Colombia's history. A group of premier private equity investors led by Morgan Stanley Asset Management investing $65 million, billionaire George Soros investing $50 million and Tiger Asset Management with $35 million together with more than 100 other European and North American institutional investors co-invested with Gilinski.  Later, the family sold control of the bank to Banco Industrial Colombiano, and its controlling stakeholder Sindicato Antioqueño, in a deal valued at $800 million, among Colombia's largest deals. Gilinski received $418 million for its stake and retained a minority position in the new bank as part of the deal. As of 2018, Bancolombia was the largest in Colombia with a market capitalization of $11 billion on the NYSE.

In 2003, Gilinski acquired and subsequently merged Banco Sudameris and Banco Tequendama. This merger created GNB Sudameris, a bank with assets of over US$10 billion that ranks among the largest private Colombian banks as of 2018. The purchase of Servibanca, an ATM network with over 2,600 machines, and Suma Valores, a stock exchange commission agent company, has further expanded the network.

In May 2012, HSBC announced the sale of its Latin American operations (Colombia, Peru, Paraguay) to Banco GNB Sudameris for $400 million in cash. 

In September 2013, Banco Sabadell announced that Gilinski became its largest shareholder as the anchor investor in a US$1.8 billion capital raise. Through the ABB and share rights issue, Gilinski's investment totals approximately $500 million. Banco Sabadell is the 5th largest bank in Spain, with over US$220 billion in assets and a 13% market share.

The Gilinski group also owns Yupi, a snack food company in Latin America, and exports to nine countries. Gilinski Group also owns Rimax Plastics, which was founded by his father Isaac Gilinski.

In December 2019, Gilinski became the largest shareholder of Metro Bank, after upping his interest in the business to 6.1%. In May 2020, he increased his stake to 9%. Gilinski holds his stake through British Virgin Islands-based Spaldy Investments.

Real estate 
In partnership with London & Regional Properties, Gilinski has developed the Panama Pacifico business and residential development in Veracruz, adjoining Panama City. Jaime Gilinski and his partners Ian and Richard Livingstone beat 16 other international firms in a competition to develop the project. The project, based on the former Howard Air Force Base in Panama, includes  of land, which makes it one of the largest development projects in the world.

Philanthropy 
In the 1990s, the Gilinskis contributed US$8 million to the Fundacion Santa Fe. This was during Jaime Gilinski's time as chairman of Banco de Colombia. La Fundación Santa Fe de Bogotá supports Santa Fe Hospital in Bogotá. Founded in 1972, this hospital is recognized as Colombia's most technologically advanced.

Gilinski is the chair of Capital Projects for The Chabad House at Harvard University. The Chabad House at Harvard is a Jewish student organization that provides educational, social, and recreational programming for students and faculty. Through the Jaime and Raquel Gilinski Endowment, Gilinski supports the David Rockefeller Center for Latin American Studies at Harvard University.

Personal life
He is married to Raquel Gilinski. They have four children and live in London, England. He has further houses in New York, Panama, Miami and Colombia.

Jaime and Raquel Gilinski have also established the Jaime and Raquel Gilinski Fellowship at Harvard Business School, awarded to MBA students from Colombia and Panama, with a secondary preference for students from other Latin American countries.

References

External links
 JGB Bank Website
 

1957 births
Living people
People from Cali
Colombian people of Lithuanian-Jewish descent
Colombian Jews
Colombian expatriates in England
Georgia Tech alumni
Harvard Business School alumni
Colombian bankers
Colombian businesspeople
Colombian industrial engineers
Colombian philanthropists
Colombian billionaires
People named in the Pandora Papers